Machecoul is a former commune in the Loire-Atlantique department in western France. On 1 January 2016, it was merged into the new commune of Machecoul-Saint-Même. Its 5,732 inhabitants are called Machecoulais. It was the site of First Massacre of Machecoul, the opening of the War in the Vendée in 1793.

Geography
The commune of Machecoul is surrounded by the following communes:
in Loire-Atlantique: Bourgneuf-en-Retz, Fresnay-en-Retz, Saint-Même-le-Tenu, Saint-Mars-de-Coutais, Saint-Lumine-de-Coutais, Saint-Philbert-de-Grand-Lieu, La Marne, Paulx
in Vendée: Bois-de-Céné.

Population

Sights
 Gallo-Roman Wood Lighthouse ("Phare à Bois").
 8th-century Merovingian sarcophagi.
 Many old mills.
 11th-century Notre-Dame-de-la-Chaume abbey.
 Former 13th-century Romanesque church.
 La Trinité church (1881).
 11th-century Cahouët Bridge ("Pont de Cahouët"), wrongly called the "Roman Bridge" ("Pont Romain") – it does not date from Roman times. Small bridge over the river Falleron.
 Castle of Machecoul, also known as "Castle of Gilles de Rais" ("Château de Gilles de Rais") or "Bluebeard's castle" ("Château de Barbe-Bleue"): close to the town centre are the ruins of the 13th-century castle of the town, once owned by the infamous child-murderer Gilles de Rais (1404–1440). Nowadays, on summer evenings, one can partake of a son et lumière show telling his story.
 The "Auditoire" (18th-century). A former court's main hall (central part), which was built in 1755.
 The Lime Kiln ("Four à Chaux") (1857). Located on Saint-Michel Island, rich in limestone. Restored in 2001.
 Les Halles (1885).
 The Hippodrome des Chaumes (1885).
 The former Segin Distillery (1886).

Economy
On the edge of town is the Gitane bicycle factory. Fans of the Tour de France will recall the Breton cyclist Bernard Hinault riding for them in the 1970s.

Machecoul has a weekly street market where one can buy roasted poulet noir, the black chicken of Challans.

Twin towns
Machecoul is twinned with:
 Ühlingen-Birkendorf, Baden-Württemberg, Germany;
 Shifnal, Shropshire, United Kingdom;
 Valea Drăganului, Transylvania, Romania.

People
Machecoul was the birthplace of:
 Gilles de Rais (1404–1440), noble, soldier, and one time brother-in-arms of Joan of Arc. He was later accused and ultimately convicted of torturing, raping and murdering dozens, if not hundreds, of young children, mostly boys.
 Marc Daviaud (born 1958), retired French professional footballer
 Marc Éliard (born 1958), bass player of the new wave/rock band Indochine.
 Cédric Michaud (born 1976), marathon speed skater.
 Mickaël Landreau (born 1979), professional football (soccer) player.

See also
Communes of the Loire-Atlantique department

References

Former communes of Loire-Atlantique
Populated places disestablished in 2016